Burlington Arcade is a covered shopping arcade in London, England, United Kingdom. It is one of the precursors of the mid-19th-century European shopping gallery and the modern shopping mall. It is near the similar Piccadilly Arcade.

The arcade was built in 1818 to the order of George Cavendish, 1st Earl of Burlington, younger brother of William Cavendish, 5th Duke of Devonshire, who had inherited the adjacent Burlington House, on what had been the side garden of the house and was reputedly to prevent passers-by throwing oyster shells and other rubbish over the wall of his home. It was designed by architect Samuel Ware. Burlington Arcade was built "for the sale of jewellery and fancy articles of fashionable demand, for the gratification of the public". However, it was also said to have been built so that the Lord's wife could shop safely amongst other genteel ladies and gentleman away from the busy, dirty, and crime-ridden open streets of London.

Burlington Arcade opened on 20 March 1819. From the outset, it positioned itself as an elegant and exclusive upmarket shopping venue, with shops offering luxury goods. It was one of London's earliest covered shopping arcades and one of several such arcades constructed in Western Europe in the early 19th century. (Other examples of grand shopping arcades include: Covered passages of Paris, Palais Royal in Paris (opened in 1784); Passage de Feydeau in Paris (opened in 1791), Galeries Royales Saint-Hubert in Brussels and The Passage in St. Petersburg, the Galleria Umberto I in Naples, and the Galleria Vittorio Emanuele II in Milan (1878).)

The original arcade consisted of a single straight top-lit walkway lined with 72 small two-storey units. Some of the units have been combined, reducing the number of shops to around 40. The Piccadilly façade, with sculptures carved by Benjamin Clemens, a professor of sculpture at the Royal College of Art, was added in 1911.

The arcade is patrolled by beadles in traditional uniforms that include top hats and frock coats. The original beadles were all former members of Lord George Cavendish's regiment, the 10th Royal Hussars. The arcade maintains Regency decorum by banning singing, humming, hurrying, and "behaving boisterously".

The present tenants include a range of clothing, footwear and accessory shops, art and antique dealers, and the jewellers and dealers in antique silver for which the Arcade is best known.

Historical events
The arcade was almost destroyed by fire in 1836, when several shops were destroyed, in 1871, and in 1936, when the arcade was subject to looting.

Parts of the arcade were badly damaged in a bombing raid during the Second World War.

In 1964, a Jaguar Mark X charged down the arcade, scattering pedestrians, and six masked men leapt out, smashed the windows of the Goldsmiths and Silversmiths Association shop, and stole jewellery valued at £35,000. They were never caught. Gates were installed to prevent this happening again.

In 2010, Thor Equities and Meyer Bergman acquired the property for £104 million. The owners hired architect Michael Blair to restore the arcade.

In May 2018, the property was sold to David and Simon Reuben for £300 million.

See also
Royal Arcade, London
Piccadilly Arcade
Kensington Arcade
Sicilian Avenue
Woburn Walk
Leadenhall Market

References

1819 establishments in England
Art Nouveau architecture in London
Art Nouveau retail buildings
Buildings and structures in Mayfair
Buildings and structures on Piccadilly
Burlington Estate
Commercial buildings completed in 1819
Grade II listed buildings in the City of Westminster
Georgian architecture in the City of Westminster
Shopping arcades in England
Shopping malls established in 1819
Shopping centres in the City of Westminster
Tourist attractions in the City of Westminster